The Reeti (also known as Rötihorn) is a mountain of the Bernese Alps, overlooking Grindelwald in the Bernese Oberland.

From the Bachalpsee, a trail leads to the summit.

References

External links
 Reeti on Hikr

Mountains of the Alps
Mountains of Switzerland
Mountains of the canton of Bern
Two-thousanders of Switzerland